Alternatives Federal Credit Union was founded in Ithaca, New York in 1979.  Their primary focus is on providing low cost services to small businesses, low income households and non-profit organizations.

History
Alternatives Federal Credit Union initially focused on local co-ops and employee owned businesses, experiencing rapid growth in their first decade. By 1990, they had almost 5,000 members and deposits totaling over $12 million.  Part of this community initiative was to start the "Socially Responsible Investment Club," which itself was a credit union for young people.  It assisted in starting other credit unions as well, offered seminars on personal finance, low income housing and entrepreneurship.

In 2014, the Credit Union National Association (CUNA) awarded AFCU their 2014 Community Credit Union of the Year Award.

See also
Ithaca HOUR

References

External links

Credit unions based in New York (state)
Ithaca, New York
1979 establishments in New York (state)